Albert Hawkins may refer to:

 Albert Hawkins (gymnast) (1886–1969), Welsh Olympic gymnast
 Albert Hawkins (wrestler) (1883–1961), British Olympic wrestler